is a passenger railway station in located in the city of Sennan, Osaka Prefecture, Japan, operated by West Japan Railway Company (JR West).

Lines

Station layout
The station consists of two island platforms connected to the station building by a footbridge. The station has a Midori no Madoguchi staffed ticket office.

Platforms

History
It was renamed  in 1932 and then  on 1 August 1941. On 1 May 1944 it became Izumi-Sunagawa Station. With the privatization of the Japan National Railways (JNR) on 1 April 1987, the station came under the aegis of the West Japan Railway Company.

Station numbering was introduced in March 2018 with Izumi-Sunagawa being assigned station number JR-R48.

Passenger statistics
In fiscal 2019, the station was used by an average of 4166 passengers daily (boarding passengers only).

Surrounding Area
 Kaieji temple ruins
 Osaka Prefectural Sennan Support School
 Museum of Ancient History
 Chokei-ji Temple

See also
List of railway stations in Japan

References

External links

 0621927 Izumi-Sunagawa Station Official Site

Railway stations in Osaka Prefecture
Railway stations in Japan opened in 1930
Sennan, Osaka